Carolina Duarte (born 8 January 1990) is a track and field athlete from Portugal competing mainly sprint events. Duarte has competed in both disabled and non-disabled sporting competitions. In disability sport she competes as a T13 athlete, a classification for athletes who are visually impaired.

Athletics career

As an athlete in non-disability events
Duarte began her athletics career competing in mainstream track and field events. Her early personal bests, set in 2010, were all in short distance sprints, setting a time of 12.17 in the 100 metres. As her career progressed she gravitated towards the 400 metres event and also competed in the 400 metres hurdles. In 2012, she was selected to join the Portugal team that competed at the 2012 European Athletics Championships, competing as part of the Women's 4 × 400 metres relay.

As a disability athlete
Due to reduced vision, Duarte was able to become classified as a T13 track and field athlete. In 2016, she was selected for the Portugal national team that competed at the IPC Athletics European Championships in Grosseto. There she competed in three events, the T13 100m, 200m and 400m sprints. In her first event, the 200 metres, she was edged into second place by France's Nantenin Keïta, who set a championship record to take the gold medal. Duarte followed this with a bronze in the 400 metres. On the penultimate day she competed in the 100 metres, and despite not running a personal best, Duarte set a championship record with a time of 12.87s.

Notes

1990 births
Living people
Portuguese female sprinters
Paralympic athletes of Portugal
Athletes (track and field) at the 2016 Summer Paralympics
Athletes (track and field) at the 2020 Summer Paralympics